Vern Krishna, is a professor of law at the University of Ottawa and of counsel at TaxChambers LLP. He is the author of fourteen texts in tax, international tax, and business law, as well as numerous articles and case comments. His writings are frequently cited by the Supreme Court of Canada and the Tax Court of Canada.

Krishna has been active in both of his professions – law and accounting. He has been a bencher of the Law Society of Upper Canada since 1990 and served as its elected head (treasurer) from 2001 to 2003.

A Certified General Accountant, he was elected president of the Certified General Accountants of Ontario in 1995. He was a visiting scholar in international tax at Harvard Law School from 1998 to 1999 and is a commissioner of the Ontario Securities Commission.

Education
Krishna received a BComm from the University of Manchester in 1963, a MBA and LLB from the University of Alberta in 1969 and 1974 respectively, a LLM from Harvard Law School in 1975, and a DCL from the University of Cambridge in 1986.

Honours
 2012 - Law Society Medal, Law Society of Upper Canada
 2005 - Doctor of Laws, Law Society of Upper Canada
 2004 - Order of Canada
 2003 - Queen Elizabeth II Diamond Jubilee Medal
 1993 - 125th Anniversary of the Confederation of Canada Medal by the Governor General of Canada
 1992 - Fellow of the Royal Society of Canada
 1989 - Queen's Counsel
 1989 - Fellow of the Certified General Accountants Association of Canada

References

External links

FLSC - Vern Krishna, C.M., Q.C.
Professional Web Page of Vern Krishna, CM, QC

1943 births
Living people
Fellows of the Royal Society of Canada
Members of the Order of Canada
Harvard Law School alumni
Academic staff of the University of Ottawa
Canadian accountants
Treasurers of the Law Society of Upper Canada
Canadian King's Counsel
Alumni of the University of Manchester
University of Alberta alumni